Hande (from Persian خنده, meaning laugh, or laughter) is a feminine Turkish given name. It is originally a Persian name but now, is a common name in Turkey. Notable people with the name include:

 Hande Ataizi (born 1973), Turkish actress
 Hande Baladin (born 1997), Turkish volleyball player
 Hande Berktan, TV presenter and journalist 
 Hande Özsan Bozatlı (born 1960), dermatologist and former President of the Assembly of European Regions.
 Hande Dalkılıç (born 1974), Turkish concert pianist
 Hande Doğandemir (born 1985), Turkish actress
 Hande Erçel (born 1993), Turkish actress
 Hande Kodja (born 1984), Belgian actress
 Hande Özyürek (born 1976), Turkish violinist. 
 Hande Soral (born 1987), Turkish actress

 Hande Subaşı (born 1984), Turkish actress and beauty pageant titleholder. 
 Hande Yener (born 1973), Turkish pop singer

It's also a surname among Kota Brahmin.

Turkish feminine given names